The Malaguni River (Mallaguni, Malangui) is a Nullah or hill stream in Khurda District, Odisha state of India. It originates on the border of Ganjam District and Khurda District. The Daya then flows southwest into Chilika Lake, which then flows to the Bay of Bengal.

There is a minor irrigation project constructed on it near Rameswar village. When it floods, some portions of Khurda, Chilika and Tangi blocks are badly affected.

References

Rivers of Odisha
Rivers of India